Sheikh Jamal Dhanmondi Club is a Bangladeshi cricket team that plays List A cricket in the Dhaka Premier League and Twenty20 cricket in the Dhaka Premier Division Twenty20 Cricket League. It is affiliated with Sheikh Jamal Dhanmondi Club football team.

List A record
 2013-14: 15 matches, won 10, finished second
 2014-15: 11 matches, won 4, finished ninth
 2015-16: 11 matches, won 5, finished ninth
 2016-17: 16 matches, won 7, finished sixth
 2017-18: 16 matches, won 10, finished third
 2018-19: 16 matches, won 9, finished fourth
 2021-22: 15 matches, won 12, champions
Mushfiqur Rahim and Tushar Imran were early captains of the List A team. Abdur Razzak was the captain in 2016–17, and Nurul Hasan in 2017–18 and 2018–19. Imrul Kayes captained the team to the title in 2021–22.

Twenty20 record
Sheikh Jamal Dhanmondi won the inaugural tournament of the Dhaka Premier Division Twenty20 Cricket League in 2018–19 when, captained by Nurul Hasan, they defeated Prime Doleshwar Sporting Club in the final by 24 runs.

Current squad
Players with international caps are listed in bold

Records
The team's highest List A score is 145 not out (off 118 balls) by Mushfiqur Rahim in 2013–14, and the best bowling figures are 5 for 18 by Arafat Sunny in 2014–15.

References

External links
 List A matches played by Sheikh Jamal Dhanmondi Club

Dhanmondi
Dhaka Premier Division Cricket League teams